Kathleen Baker (born February 28, 1997) is an American competition swimmer who specializes in freestyle and backstroke events. At the 2016 Summer Olympics, she won a gold medal in the 4x100-meter medley relay and a silver medal in the individual 100-meter backstroke. She is the former world-record holder in 100 meter backstroke, set on July 28, 2018 in 58.00 at the William Woollett Jr. Aquatics Center in Irvine, CA. Baker is also the former world-record holder in the 4x100 meter medley relay with Lilly King, Dana Vollmer, and Simone Manuel.

Early life
Baker attended Forsyth Country Day School until the tenth grade and then was home-schooled, so it would be easy to travel back and forth between Winston-Salem, North Carolina and Charlotte, North Carolina to swim and train with SwimMAC Carolina. Her mother swam for the College of Charleston in Charleston, South Carolina, and her older sister, Rachel, currently swims for Washington and Lee University.

In 2010, Baker was diagnosed with Crohn's disease.

Career

College swimming
Baker attended the University of California, Berkeley, where she competed for the California Golden Bears swimming and diving team for three years from 2015 to 2018.

2014-2015 
At the 2014 Phillips 66 Nationals, the qualification meet for the 2014 Pan Pacifics, Baker finished second in the 200-meter backstroke and qualified for the team. She finished ninth in the 200-meter backstroke at Pan Pacifics, just outside the final.

Baker was also selected to the 2015 World Championships roster in the 100-meter backstroke. She placed eighth in the final of the 100-meter backstroke. She also swam in the prelims for the 4x100-meter medley relay, but did not receive a medal as the final squad finished fourth.

2016 Summer Olympics

At the 2016 Olympic Trials, Baker qualified for her first Olympics in the 100-meter backstroke by finishing second with a time of 59.29.

In Rio, she won a silver medal in the 100-meter backstroke with a time of 58.75, three tenths behind the winner Katinka Hosszú. She was not considered by many to be a medal threat since she had never broken 59 seconds prior to the Olympics. Baker also won a gold medal alongside Lilly King, Dana Vollmer, and Simone Manuel as the lead off of the 4x100-meter medley relay.

2017

At the 2017 World Championships, Baker won three medals. She won silver in the 100-meter backstroke, bronze in the 200-meter backstroke, and gold in the 4x100-meter medley relay. Though she did not medal in the 50-meter backstroke, Baker broke Natalie Coughlin's American record in the event in the semifinals with a time of 27.48. Baker led off the women's 4x100-meter medley relay, with the team winning with a time of 3:51.55. The team of Baker, Lilly King, Kelsi Worrell, and Simone Manuel broke the 2012 world record of 3:52.05 set by Missy Franklin, Rebecca Soni, Dana Vollmer, and Allison Schmitt.

Personal life
In July 2021, Baker announced on her engagement to her long-time boyfriend and United States Marine, Sean Dowling.

See also
List of people diagnosed with Crohn's disease

References

External links
 
 
 
 
 
 

1997 births 
American female backstroke swimmers
American female freestyle swimmers
California Golden Bears women's swimmers 
Living people
Medalists at the 2016 Summer Olympics 
Olympic gold medalists for the United States in swimming
Olympic silver medalists for the United States in swimming 
People with Crohn's disease
Sportspeople from Winston-Salem, North Carolina 
Swimmers at the 2016 Summer Olympics 
Swimmers from North Carolina
World Aquatics Championships medalists in swimming
World record setters in swimming